Little Bull Lake is a lake in Algoma District, Ontario, Canada. The primary inflow is an unnamed creek from Bull Lake, and the primary outflow is an unnamed creek to Burnett Lake, which flows via Low Creek into the West River aux Sables, a tributary of the River aux Sables.

See also
List of lakes in Ontario

References

Lakes of Algoma District